Kaleigh Ann Riehl (born October 21, 1996) is an American professional soccer player who plays as a defender for National Women's Soccer League (NWSL) club San Diego Wave FC.

Riehl has represented the United States at the U-18, U-20 and U-23 levels. She was called up to the senior team training camp in January 2019. Riehl played for Penn State at the collegiate level and was the 11th pick in the 2020 NWSL College Draft, going to Sky Blue FC.

Early life
Riehl was born on October 21, 1996 in Fairfax Station, Virginia. She played with Braddock Road Youth Club '95 Elite for 11 years, with whom she won several competitions.

College career
Riehl played with Penn State University for her entire college career. As a freshman, she started all 27 matches. She was named to the Big 10 all-freshman team and helped lead the team to winning the NCAA Championship. She was redshirted for the 2016 season, during which she started for the U.S. six times at the FIFA U-20 World Cup. As a sophomore, she started all 24 matches and recorded 13 clean sheets. As a junior, she started all 25 matches, recorded 13 clean sheets, and was named Big 10 defender of the year. As a senior, she started all 25 matches. Over all four years, she set the NCAA record for minutes played as an outfield player with 8,847 minutes played.

Club career

Sky Blue FC, 2020
On January 16, 2020, Riehl took part in the NWSL College Draft. She was the 11th pick, being chosen by Sky Blue FC. Riehl made her professional debut in the 2020 NWSL Challenge Cup on July 4, 2020 against the Utah Royals FC.

Racing Louisville, 2021
On November 12, 2020, Riehl was selected by Racing Louisville FC in the 2020 NWSL Expansion Draft.

San Diego Wave FC, 2022-
On December 16, 2022, Riehl was selected by San Diego Wave FC in the 2022 NWSL Expansion Draft.

International career
Riehl has played for multiple youth national teams throughout her career. In January 2020, she was called up for the senior team training camp.

References

External links
 

1996 births
Living people
American women's soccer players
Soccer players from Virginia
People from Fairfax Station, Virginia
Women's association football defenders
Penn State Nittany Lions women's soccer players
NJ/NY Gotham FC draft picks
NJ/NY Gotham FC players
United States women's under-20 international soccer players
National Women's Soccer League players
Racing Louisville FC players
San Diego Wave FC players